The National Communications Authority of Ghana is the Government of Ghana agency responsible for the licensing of media houses and organizations in Ghana.
The non-Executive Board Chairman is Kwaku Sakyi-Addo.

See also 

 List of telecommunications regulatory bodies

References

External links 

 

Ministries and Agencies of State of Ghana
Telecommunications regulatory authorities
Regulation in Ghana